Scarabea: How Much Land Does a Man Need? is a 1969 West German drama film directed by Hans-Jürgen Syberberg, starring Walter Buschhoff, Nicoletta Machiavelli,  and Karsten Peters. It tells the story of a German tourist in Sardinia who goes on a hike which becomes a brutal experience. The film was Syberberg's first fiction film and uses motifs from the 1886 short story "How Much Land Does a Man Need?" by Leo Tolstoy. It won the Deutscher Filmpreis for Best Actor (Buschhoff) and Best Cinematography.

Cast
 Walter Buschhoff as G. W. Bach
 Nicoletta Machiavelli as Scarabea
  as Der Graf
 Karsten Peters as Regisseur
 Chris A. Holenia
 Rudolf Rhomberg
 Norma Jordan

References

External links 
 

1969 films
1960s avant-garde and experimental films
Films based on short fiction
Films based on works by Leo Tolstoy
Films directed by Hans-Jürgen Syberberg
Films set in Sardinia
1960s German-language films
German avant-garde and experimental films
West German films
1960s German films